Nard John "Nards" V. Pinto (born October 15, 1990) is a Filipino basketball player for the Barangay Ginebra San Miguel of the Philippine Basketball Association (PBA).

Professional career
Pinto was drafted 19th overall by the GlobalPort Batang Pier in the 2014 PBA draft.

In 2015, he joined the Mahindra Enforcer.

In September 2016, he joined the Blackwater Elite after becoming an unrestricted free agent.

On January 7, 2019, he was traded to the Phoenix Pulse Fuel Masters for Joseph Eriobu. However, before appearing in a game with the Fuel Masters, on January 12, he was traded to the Meralco Bolts for Jason Ballesteros and a 2020 second-round pick. The day after, he signed a two-year contract extension with the Bolts.

On January 1, 2022, Pinto became an unrestricted free agent. On January 7, he signed a three-year deal with the Barangay Ginebra San Miguel after declining a contract extension with the Bolts.

PBA career statistics

As of the end of 2021 season

Season-by-season averages
 
|-
| align=left | 
| align=left | GlobalPort
| 21 || 5.7 || .355 || .182 || .286 || 1.4 || .7 || .2 || .0 || 1.2
|-
| align=left rowspan=2| 
| align=left | Mahindra
| rowspan=2|32 || rowspan=2|17.4 || rowspan=2|.391 || rowspan=2|.206 || rowspan=2|.643 || rowspan=2|2.6 || rowspan=2|2.6 || rowspan=2|.6 || rowspan=2|.1 || rowspan=2|3.9
|-
| align=left | Blackwater
|-
| align=left | 
| align=left | Blackwater
| 34 || 21.5 || .424 || .356 || .520 || 3.1 || 3.4 || .6 || .1 || 6.3
|-
| align=left | 
| align=left | Blackwater
| 34 || 23.0 || .485 || .517 || .605 || 3.2 || 4.3 || 1.0 || .1 || 6.6
|-
| align=left | 
| align=left | Meralco
| 41 || 13.0 || .357 || .316 || .731 || 1.6 || 1.3 || .5 || .0 || 3.5
|-
| align=left | 
| align=left | Meralco
| 17 || 10.3 || .229 || .125 || .385 || 1.3 || 1.1 || .4 || .0 || 1.8
|-
| align=left rowspan=2| 
| align=left | Meralco
| rowspan=2|40 || rowspan=2|22.9 || rowspan=2|.393 || rowspan=2|.342 || rowspan=2|.659 || rowspan=2|3.0 || rowspan=2|2.3 || rowspan=2|.7 || rowspan=2|.1 || rowspan=2|6.9
|-
| align=left | Barangay Ginebra
|-
|-class=sortbottom
| align=center colspan=2 | Career
| 219 || 17.4 || .401 || .336 || .592 || 2.4 || 2.4 || .6 || .1 || 4.7

References

1990 births
Living people
Arellano Chiefs basketball players
Barangay Ginebra San Miguel players
Basketball players from Davao City
Blackwater Bossing players
Filipino men's basketball players
Meralco Bolts players
NorthPort Batang Pier draft picks
NorthPort Batang Pier players
Philippine Basketball Association All-Stars
Point guards
Terrafirma Dyip players